Angela McCormick Bisig (born 1964/1965) is an American lawyer from Kentucky who serves as a justice of the Kentucky Supreme Court. She previously served as chief judge of the Jefferson County Circuit Court from 2020 to 2023.

Education 

Bisig received a Bachelor of Arts from the University of Louisville in 1987 and a Juris Doctor from the University of Louisville School of Law in 1990.

Career

As a lawyer, Bisig practiced civil law with the law firms of Brown, Todd & Heyburn and Greenebaum Doll & McDonald; she also worked as a prosecutor.

Judicial state court service 

In 2002, Bisig was elected to serve as a Jefferson County district judge. She was elected the chief judge of district court in 2012. She was elected to the circuit court in November 2012. She has served as chief judge of the circuit court since 2020.

Kentucky Supreme Court 

On November 8, 2022, Bisig was elected as a justice of the Kentucky Supreme Court, defeating challenger Jason Bowman. She was endorsed by Citizens for Better Judges. Her term began on January 2, 2023 and she was sworn in on January 10, 2023.

Personal life 

Bisig is married to Arnold Rivera and has three sons and two step-children.

Electoral history

References

External links 

1960s births
Living people
Year of birth missing (living people)
Place of birth missing (living people)
20th-century American women lawyers
20th-century American lawyers
21st-century American women judges
21st-century American judges
21st-century American women lawyers
21st-century American lawyers
American prosecutors
Justices of the Kentucky Supreme Court
Kentucky lawyers
Kentucky state court judges
University of Louisville alumni
University of Louisville School of Law alumni